Pycnocomon is a genus of flowering plants belonging to the family Caprifoliaceae.

Its native range is Mediterranean.

Species:

Pycnocomon intermedium 
Pycnocomon rutifolium

References

Caprifoliaceae
Caprifoliaceae genera